Butti is a male Arabic first and surname. Notable people with first and surname include:

Surname
Abdulla Bin Butti (born 23 Feb 1973), Emirati chief executive
Alessandro Butti (1893–1959), Italian designer 
Dina Butti, Egyptian/Canadian TV presenter, writer, and artist 
Enrico Butti (1847–1932), Italian sculptor 
Hamed bin Butti bin Khadem Al Hamed, Emirati royalty
Khaled Butti (born 1991), Emirati football player
Maktoum bin Butti bin Sohal, 19th century Emir of Dubai
Saeed bin Butti, 19th century Emir of Dubai

First name
Butti bin Sohail, 20th century Emir of Dubai